The culture, evolution, and history of women who were born in, live in, and are from the continent of Africa reflect the evolution and history of the African continent itself.

Numerous short studies regarding women's history in African nations have been conducted. Many studies focus on the historic roles and status of women in specific countries and regions, such as Egypt, Ethiopia, Morocco, Nigeria Lesotho, and sub-Saharan Africa. Recently, scholars have begun to focus on the evolution of women's status throughout the history of Africa using less common sources, such as songs from Malawi, weaving techniques in Sokoto, and historical linguistics.

The status of women in Africa is varied across nations and regions. For example, Rwanda is the only country in the world where women hold more than half the seats in parliament — 51.9% as of July 2019, but Morocco only has one female minister in its cabinet. Significant efforts towards gender equality have been made through the creation of the African Charter on Human and People's Rights, which encourages member states to end discrimination and violence against women. With the exception of Morocco and Burundi, all African states have adopted this charter. However, despite these strides towards equality, women still face various issues related to gender inequality, such as disproportionate levels of poverty and education, poor health and nutrition, lack of political power, limited workforce participation, gender-based violence, female genital mutilation, and child marriage.

History of African women 

 
The study of African women's history emerged as a field relatively soon after African history became a widely respected academic subject. Historians such as Jan Vansina and Walter Rodney forced Western academia to acknowledge the existence of precolonial African societies and states in the wake of the African independence movements of the 1960s, although they mainly focused on men's history. Ester Boserup, a scholar of historical economics, published her groundbreaking book, Women's Role in Economic Development, in 1970. This book illustrated the central role women had played in the history of Africa as economic producers and how those systems had been disrupted by colonialism. By the 1980s, scholars had picked up threads of African women's history across the continent, for example, George Brooks' 1976 study of women traders in precolonial Senegal, Margaret Jean Hays' 1976 study of how economic change in colonial Kenya affected Luo women, and Kristin Mann's 1985 study on marriage in Nigeria. Over time, historians have debated the role and status of women in precolonial vs. colonial society, explored how women have dealt with changing forms of oppression, examined how phenomena like domesticity became gendered, unearthed women's roles in national struggles for independence, and even argued that the category of "woman" in some cases cannot be applied in precolonial contexts. Women have been shown to be essential historical, economic and social actors in practically every region of Africa for centuries.

Culture

In the home
From the 1940s until Morocco's declaration of independence from the tutelage of France in 1956, Moroccan women lived in family units that were "enclosed households" or harems. The tradition of the harem lifestyle for women gradually ended upon Morocco's independence from France in 1956.

The traditional division of labour in Senegal saw Senegalese women as responsible for household tasks such as cooking, cleaning, and childcare. They were also responsible for a large share of agricultural work, including weeding and harvesting for common crops such as rice. In recent decades, economic change and urbanization has led to many young men migrating to the cities like Dakar. Rural women have become increasingly involved in managing village forestry resources and operating millet and rice mills.

In society
Gender discrimination was solidified across the continent during the colonial era. In the pre-colonial period, women held chieftaincies in their own right, and some tribes even had traditions to pass dynastic rights to exclusively male titles to royal descendants through the matrilineal line (e.g., Asanteman, Balobedu, Ijawland, Wolof kingdoms). Colonialism eroded the power of these chieftaincies and traditions, and reinforced what was by then an already ascendant patriarchy thereafter. This was met with fierce opposition, most famously in the case of the Abeokuta women's revolt in Nigeria. Following independence, sovereign states solidified the gender norms and class structures inherited from their colonial predecessors, as both the first and second generations of African administrations failed to restore women's traditional powers. This led to more opposition, and over the course of the past couple of decades there has been a significant improvement in the situation.

Titled females throughout Africa's history include Fatim Beye, Ndoye Demba and Ndate Yalla Mbodj of Senegal, Moremi, Idia, Amina, Orompoto, Nana Asma'u and Efunroye Tinubu of Nigeria, Yaa Asantewaa of Ghana, Yennenga of Burkina Faso, Hangbe of Benin, Makeda, Zawditu and Embet Ilen of Ethiopia and Eritrea, Nandi of South Africa and Hatshepsut of Egypt. All are hailed as inspirations for contemporary African women. Many of Africa's contemporary titled women are members of the African Queens and Women Cultural Leaders Network, a voluntary organization.

In literature 
Notable African writers have focused in their work on issues specifically concerning women in Africa, including Nawal El Saadawi (in books such as Woman at Point Zero and The Hidden Face of Eve), Flora Nwapa (Efuru), Ama Ata Aidoo (Anowa, Changes: A Love Story), and Buchi Emecheta (The Bride Price, The Slave Girl, The Joys of Motherhood).

Education

Sub-Saharan Africa 
Although sub-Saharan African countries have made considerable strides in providing equal access to education for boys and girls, 23% of girls do not receive a primary education. Factors such as a girl's social class and mother's education heavily influence her ability to attain an education Without easy access to schools, mothers are often the first and perhaps only form of education that a girl may receive. In Côte d'Ivoire, girls are 35 times more likely to attend secondary school if their father graduated from college. With 40% of girls getting married before the age of 18 in sub-Saharan Africa, girls are often forced to drop out of school to start families. Early marriage reinforces the cultural belief that educating daughters is a waste of resources because parents will not receive any economic benefit once their daughter is married to another family. This leads to the phenomena known as son-preference where families will choose to send their sons to school rather than their daughters because of the economic benefit that could educated sons afford the family. In addition, girls that do attend school tend to attend schools that are of lower quality. Bad quality schools are characterized by their lack of course offerings and weak preparation for the workforce. Another issue in education systems is the segregation of school subjects by gender. Girls are more likely to take domestic science and biology courses, whereas boys are more likely to take mathematics, chemistry, engineering, and vocational training. According to UNESCO Institute for Statistics, 58.8% of women are literate in 2018. However, literacy rates within sub-Saharan Africa vary a lot from Chad having a 14% female literacy rate in comparison to Seychelles 96%.

South Africa

According to Rowena Martineau's analysis on the educational disparities between men and women in South Africa, women have been historically overlooked within the education system. Some barriers women face in receiving education is that their education is less prioritized than their brothers, sexual assault is a common fear and widespread occurrence, and the social pressures to become married and start a family all hinder women's opportunity to become educated. Furthermore, women choose to study nursing and teaching above any other profession, which further excludes them from entering the higher-paying jobs in STEM, that also contributes to gender inequality.

Sierra Leone

Since the founding of Sierra Leone in 1787, the women in Sierra Leone have been a major influence in the political and economic development of the nation. They have also played an important role in the education system, founding schools and colleges, with some such as Hannah Benka-Coker being honoured with the erection of a statue for her contributions and Lati Hyde-Forster, first woman to graduate from Fourah Bay College being honored with a doctor of civil laws degree by the University of Sierra Leone.

Angola

In Angola, groups like the Organization of Angolan Women were founded in order to provide easier access to education and voting ability. The organization also advocated the passing of anti-discrimination and literacy laws.

North Africa 
The seven countries—Algeria, Egypt, Libya, Morocco, Sudan, Tunisia, and Western Sahara—that make up North Africa have unique educational environments because of their relative wealth and strong Islamic faith. Gender norms and roles are very strictly defined to protect women's honor and modesty, which have inadvertently become barriers to women receiving equal education as men as women are expected to stay at home and raise a family. These gender expectations devalue women's education and bar girls access to education. As a result, North African countries such as Egypt and Morocco have higher illiteracy rates for women than other countries with similar GDPs. Similar to sub-Saharan Africa, women are disproportionately over-represented in the professions of teaching, medicine, and social welfare. Gender stereotypes are further reinforced by the fact that only 20% of women are part of the labor force. This creates a negative cycle wherein women are expected to stay at home, barring them from further educational opportunities, and creating barriers for women to gain the education and skills necessary to find gainful employment.

Morocco

Morocco's female literacy rate is 65%, which is still significantly lower than North Africa's female literacy rate of 73%. Moroccan women live under a strong framework of acceptable gender roles and expectations. Agnaou's study in 2004 found that for 40% of illiterate women, the greatest obstacle for women to become literate were their parents. Due to societal views of "literacy" and "education" as masculine, there is no strong policy push to educate women in Morocco. There have been various literacy campaigns run by the government such as the creation of the Adult Literacy Directorate in 1997 and the National Education and Training Charter. These literacy campaigns have had varying success in reducing illiteracy due to limited funding, lack of human resources, and cultural inertia.

Politics

North Africa 
Algeria

Algeria is regarded as a relatively liberal nation and the status of women reflects this. Unlike other countries in the region, equality for women is enshrined in Algerian laws and the constitution. They can vote and run for political positions.

Libya

Since independence, Libyan leaders have been committed to improving the condition of women but within the framework of Arabic and Islamic values. Central to the revolution of 1969 was the empowerment of women and removal of inferior status. 

Niger

In Niger, many of the laws adopted by the government of Niger to protect the rights of Nigerien women are often based on Muslim beliefs.

Sahrawi Arab Democratic Republic

Women in the Sahrawi Arab Democratic Republic are women who were born in, who live in, or are from the Sahrawi Arab Democratic Republic (SADR) in the region of the Western Sahara. In Sahrawi society, women share responsibilities at every level of its community and social organization. Article 41 of the Constitution of the Sahrawi Arab Democratic Republic ensures that the state will pursue "the promotion of women and [their] political, social and cultural participation, in the construction of society and the country's development".

West Africa 
Benin

The state of the rights of women in Benin has improved markedly since the restoration of democracy and the ratification of the Constitution, and the passage of the Personal and Family Code in 2004, both of which overrode various traditional customs that systematically treated women unequally. Still, inequality and discrimination persist. Polygamy and forced marriage are illegal but they still occur.

Nigeria

The freedom and right for women in Africa to participate in leadership and electoral processes differs by country and even ethnic groups within the same nation. For example, in Nigeria, women in Southern Nigeria had the right to vote as early as 1950  and contested for seats in the 1959 Nigerian elections, whereas women in Northern Nigeria could not vote or contest until 1976 .

Central Africa 
Democratic Republic of the Congo

Women in the Democratic Republic of the Congo have not attained a position of full equality with men, with their struggle continuing to this day. Although the Mobutu regime paid lip service to the important role of women in society, and although women enjoy some legal rights (e.g., the right to own property and the right to participate in the economic and political sectors), custom and legal constraints still limit their opportunities. From 1939 to 1943, over 30% of adult Congolese women in Stanleyville (now Kisangani) were so registered. The taxes they paid constituted the second largest source of tax revenue for Stanleyville.

Rwanda

Claire Wallace, Christian Haerpfer and Pamela Abbott write that, in spite of Rwanda having the highest representation of women in parliament in the world, there are three major gender issues in Rwandan society: the workloads of women, access to education and gender-based violence. They conclude that the attitudes to women in Rwanda's political institutions has not filtered through to the rest of Rwandan society, and that for men, but not women, there are generational differences when it comes to gender-based attitudes.

East Africa 
Seychelles

Women in Seychelles enjoy the same legal, political, economic, and social rights as men. Seychellois society is essentially matriarchal. Mothers tend to be dominant in the household, controlling most current expenditures and looking after the interests of the children. Unwed mothers are the societal norm, and the law requires fathers to support their children. Men are important for their earning ability, but their domestic role is relatively peripheral. Older women can usually count on financial support from family members living at home or contributions from the earnings of grown-up children.

South Sudan

The women of the Republic of South Sudan had also been active in liberation causes, by providing food and shelters to soldiers, caring for children and caring for wounded heroes and heroines during their political struggle prior to the country's independence. An example was their formation of the Katiba Banat or women's battalion.

Sudan

Sudan is a developing nation that faces many challenges in regards to gender inequality. Freedom House gave Sudan the lowest possible ranking among repressive regimes during 2012. South Sudan received a slightly higher rating but it was also rated as "not free". In the 2013 report of 2012 data, Sudan ranks 171st out of 186 countries on the Human Development Index (HDI). Sudan also is one of very few countries that are not a signatory on the Convention on the Elimination of All Forms of Discrimination Against Women (CEDAW). Despite all of this, there have been positive changes in regards to gender equality in Sudan. As of 2012, women comprise 24.1% of the National Assembly of Sudan.

Uganda

The roles of Ugandan women are clearly subordinate to those of men, despite the substantial economic and social responsibilities of women in Uganda's many traditional societies. Women are taught to accede to the wishes of their fathers, brothers, husbands, and sometimes other men as well, and to demonstrate their subordination to men in most areas of public life. Even in the 1980s, women in rural areas of Buganda were expected to kneel when speaking to a man. At the same time, however, women shouldered the primary responsibilities for childcare and subsistence cultivation, and in the twentieth century, women have made substantial contributions to cash-crop agriculture.

Workforce participation 
Women in Africa are highly active whether that is within the sphere of formal or informal work. However, within the formal sphere, African women hold only 40% of formal jobs which has led to a labor gender gap of 54%. According to Bandara's analysis in 2015, this labor gender gap is equivalent to a US$255 billion loss in economic growth because women cannot fully contribute to economic growth. In addition, women earn on average two-thirds of their male colleague's salaries. Some of the challenges African women face in finding formal work are their general lack of education and technical skills, weak protection against gender discriminatory hiring, and double burden of work with the expectation to continue housekeeping and childbearing. Most of Africa's food is produced by women, but each female farmer produces significantly less food than male farmers because female farmers do not have access to the same land, fertilizers, technology, and credit to achieve maximum efficiency. For example, women in Ethiopia and Ghana produce 26% and 17% less food than their male counterparts as a result of resource inequality.

The Senegalese government's rural development agency aims to organize village women and involve them more actively in the development process. Women play a prominent role in village health committees and prenatal and postnatal programs. In urban areas, cultural change has led to women entering the labour market as office and retail clerks, domestic workers and unskilled workers in textile mills and tuna-canning factories. Non-governmental organizations are also active in promoting women's economic opportunities in Senegal. Micro-financing loans for women's businesses have improved the economic situation of many.

In May 2011, in Djibouti, Director of Gender for the Department of Women and Family Choukri Djibah launched the project SIHA (Strategic Initiative for the Horn of Africa), which is designed to support and reinforce the economic capacity of women in Djibouti, funded with a grant from the European Union of 28 Million Djibouti francs.

Notable women 
Ellen Johnson Sirleaf of Liberia was Africa's first woman president. Since Sirleaf's election to office, Joyce Banda of Malawi, Ameenah Gurib of Mauritius and Sahle-Work Zewde of Ethiopia have also risen to the presidencies of their respective countries. Some other political leaders (in no particular order) are Sylvie Kinigi of Burundi, Luisa Diogo of Mozambique, Agathe Uwilingiyimana of Rwanda, Maria das Neves of Sao Tome and Principe, Aminata Toure of Senegal and Saara Kuugongelwa of Namibia. Each has held the office of prime minister of her country.

In addition to political leaders, African nations boast many female artists, writers, and activists. For example: Sao Tome and Principe's lyricist of the national anthem and renowned writer, Alda do Espirito Santo; South African singer and apartheid activist, Miriam Makeba; Nigerian novelist and speaker, Chimamanda Ngozi Adichie; Ethiopian entrepreneur of SoleRebels, Bethlehem Alemu; Nigerien architect, Mariam Kamara; and environmental activist, Wanjira Mathai; Nigerian US-based philanthropist  Efe Ukala; Nigerian Architect  creative entrepreneur, public speaker and author  Tosin Oshinowo.

Gender-based violence 

The 2003 Maputo Protocol of the African Union addressed gender-based violence against women, defined as meaning "all acts perpetrated against women which cause or could cause them physical, sexual, psychological, and economic harm, including the threat to take such acts; or to undertake the imposition of arbitrary restrictions on or deprivation of fundamental freedoms in private or public life in peace time and during situations of armed conflicts or of war...".

Legal protections for sexual assault 

In Benin, enforcement of the law against rape, the punishment for which can be up to five years in prison, is hampered by corruption, ineffective police work, and fear of social stigma.  Police incompetence results in most sexual offenses being reduced to misdemeanors. Domestic violence is widespread, with penalties of up to three years in prison, but women are reluctant to report cases and authorities are reluctant to intervene in what are generally considered private matters.

Female genital mutilation 

In some African cultures, female genital mutilation is seen as traditional passage into womanhood and a way to purify a woman's body. There are four levels of female circumcision: Type 1 involves the complete removal of the clitoris, Type 2 goes beyond Type 1 and removes the labia minora as well, Type 3 stitches the vagina after a Type 2 procedure, and Type 4 is any mutilation of vaginal tissue. The procedure is very painful and often practiced without proper medical equipment and hygiene procedures leading to a high risk of infection and chronic pain. Female genital mutilation is practiced in Senegal, Mauritania, Mali, Nigeria, Niger, Chad, Egypt, Cameroon, Sudan, Ethiopia, Somalia, Kenya, Uganda, Central African Republic, Ghana, Togo, Benin, Burkina Faso, Sierra Leone among others.

Femicide 
Femicide is broadly defined as the "intentional murder of women," which includes honor killings, dowry killings, sexual orientation hate crimes, and female infanticide.  According to a 2013 study by Abrahams, South Africa has the fourth highest rate of female homicide with 12.9 per 100,000 women being murdered by intimate partners in South Africa annually. With a rate of 7.5/100,000 women, women in South Africa are four times more likely to be murdered with a gun than a woman in the United States.

See also 

 History of Africa
 Women's history
 Women and agriculture in Sub-Saharan Africa
 Women in Christianity
 Women in Islam
 African Women in Mathematics Association
 Daughters of Africa

North Africa 
 Women in Algeria
 Women in Egypt
 Women in Libya
 Women in Mauritania
 Women in Morocco 
 Women in Sudan
 Women in Tunisia

West Africa 
 Women in Benin
 Women in Burkina Faso
 Women in Cape Verde
 Women in the Gambia
 Women in Ghana
 Women in Guinea
 Women in Guinea-Bissau
 Women in the Ivory Coast
 Women in Liberia
 Women in Mali
 Women in Niger
 Women in Nigeria
 Women in Saint Helena
 Women in Senegal
 Women in Sierra Leone
 Women in Togo

Central Africa 
 Women in Burundi
 Women in Cameroon
 Women in the Central African Republic
 Women in Chad
 Women in the Republic of the Congo
 Women in the Democratic Republic of the Congo
 Women in Equatorial Guinea
 Women in Gabon
 Women in Rwanda
 Women in São Tomé and Príncipe

East Africa 
 Women in Comoros
 Women in Djibouti
 Women in Eritrea
 Women in Ethiopia
 Women in Kenya
 Women in Mauritius
 Women in Mayotte
 Women in Réunion
 Women in the Republic of Seychelles
 Women in Somalia
 Women in Somaliland
 Women in South Sudan
 Women in Tanzania
 Women in Uganda

South Africa 
 Women in Angola
 Women in Botswana
 Women in Eswatini
 Women in Lesotho
 Women in Madagascar
 Women in Malawi
 Women in Mozambique
 Women in Namibia
 Women in South Africa
 Women in Zambia
 Women in Zimbabwe

References

External links 

 UN Women Africa
 Overall status of women in Africa, United Nations University
 Women in Society (South Africa)
 Dimandja, Agnes Loteta, The Role and Place of Women in Sub-Saharan African Societies, 30 July 2004
 Nwoko-Ud, Chichi, "Chebe Stressed the Role of Women in African Society" 
 
 
 

 
African women